Yogi Bear's All Star Comedy Christmas Caper is a 1982 animated Christmas television special starring Yogi Bear. It is the third and final Yogi Christmas special. Along with Yogi's traditional cast, the characters also met up with many other Hanna-Barbera characters, including Magilla Gorilla and Fred Flintstone.

Plot
Huckleberry Hound brings his friends Hokey Wolf, Snagglepuss, Quick Draw McGraw, Augie Doggie and Doggie Daddy, and Snooper and Blabber with him to visit Jellystone Park for Christmas and they discover Yogi Bear and Boo-Boo have escaped from Jellystone and hidden out in a department store, where Yogi is posing as a Santa Claus. Along the way, he helps a little girl named Judy Jones rediscover her faith in Christmas when her father, a billionaire named J. Wellington Jones, is too busy for her. Yogi says that many parents have to work hard to support their kids, and since her father is not home, Yogi and Boo-Boo propose escorting Judy through the city to bring her to her dad.

Ranger Smith and the others look for Yogi when they learn he and Boo-Boo are in the city. After getting a picnic basket from a man named Murray, Yogi reunites with his friends who help to look for Judy's father. Auggie Doggie and Doggie Daddy agree to watch over Judy while they are away.

 In his search, Snagglepuss encounters Fred Flintstone and Barney Rubble as Street Santa Claus who are collecting money for a Bedrock charity. They tell him to ask a passing lady his question for donations. When the old lady screams in fear of Snagglepuss, Fred and Barney attack him, claiming it to be an entertainment purpose. Snooper and Blabber go to the police.
 Quick Draw has no luck as Mr. Jinks states that nobody named Mr. Jones lives in his building. Pixie and Dixie leave a present for Mr. Jinks which contains a bulldog.
 Magilla Gorilla, Wally Gator, and Yakky Doodle haven't seen Mr. Jones either. As Yogi hasn't had any luck locating her dad's office, they remain in the park to try to figure out a plan there.

At Judy's home, J. Wellington Jones is troubled when his daughter isn't there, so he calls the police to help find her. Also working with the police is Ranger Smith, who is looking for Yogi and Boo-Boo. The police are at the department store where Judy was last seen and interrogate all the men who work as Santas. When they realize Judy went off with a Santa who wasn't a department store employee, they assume she was kidnapped. This accusation concerns Ranger Smith (despite having past problems with Yogi's antics, he can't believe Yogi would commit such a grave act).

Snooper and Blabber were speaking to Police Chief Blake at the time when word comes that Judy was seen in the park by a patrol car, and the Chief heads out to personally see the arrest of Judy's kidnapper.

At the park, Yogi and his friends celebrate Christmas when the police arrive with Mr. Jones and Ranger Smith. As he is being loaded into the paddy wagon, Yogi tells Mr. Jones that he needs to spend more time with Judy before she becomes an adult, but Mr. Jones denies it because he's busy all the time and is never home only to then realize that Yogi is right.

Guilty over his failure of being a good father to Judy, Mr. Jones tells the police to release Yogi by telling Police Chief Blake that it was really his fault that Judy ran off with Yogi, taking full responsibility for the whole debacle that's happened today. Ranger Smith takes care of sorting out anything else the police would charge Yogi with.

The special then ends with everyone singing Christmas carols around a campfire in the park.

Cast
 Daws Butler - Yogi Bear, Huckleberry Hound, Snagglepuss, Quick Draw McGraw, Mr. Jinks, Hokey Wolf, Augie Doggie, Snooper and Blabber, Dixie, Wally Gator
 Mel Blanc - Barney Rubble, Bulldog, Security Guard #1
 Henry Corden - Fred Flintstone, Policeman, Security Guard #2
 Georgi Irene - Judy Jones
 Allan Melvin - Magilla Gorilla, Murray
 Don Messick - Boo-Boo Bear, Ranger Smith, Pixie
 John Stephenson - Doggie Daddy, Butler, Announcer
 Hal Smith - J. Wellington Jones, Police Sergeant, Zookeeper #1
 Janet Waldo - Mrs. Jones, Murray's Wife, Lady in the Street, P.A. Voice at Bus Depot
 Jimmy Weldon - Yakky Doodle, Zookeeper #2

Home media
On , Yogi Bear's All Star Comedy Christmas Caper was released by Turner Home Entertainment on VHS, later a DVD of it came out on December 7, 2010, by Warner Home Video.

See also
 List of works produced by Hanna-Barbera
 The Yogi Bear Show
 Casper's First Christmas
 Yogi's First Christmas
 Yogi's Treasure Hunt
 The New Yogi Bear Show
 Fender Bender 500
 Yo Yogi!
 List of Hanna-Barbera characters
 List of Yogi Bear characters

References

External links
 
 
 Toonarific – Yogi Bear's All Star Comedy Christmas Caper at Toonarific
 POVonline Daws Butler, Part 4 at POVonline, by writer Mark Evanier

1980s American television specials
1982 in American television
1982 television specials
1982 films
CBS television specials
Christmas television specials
Musical television specials
Hanna-Barbera television specials
Yogi Bear films
Huckleberry Hound specials
The Flintstones television specials
Yogi Bear television specials
1980s animated television specials
1980s American animated films
Films scored by Hoyt Curtin
Animated television specials
Animated crossover television specials
American Christmas television specials
Animated Christmas television specials